Bann Na Mohra is a town in the Islamabad Capital Territory of Pakistan. It is located at 33° 27' 50N 73° 22' 10E with an altitude of 562 metres (1847 feet).

References 

Union councils of Islamabad Capital Territory